Syed, better known by his stage name Sanjeev Karthick is an Indian actor who appears in Tamil language films and television. He made his debut in the 2009 film, Kulir 100°.

Career
Prior to acting in films, he was enrolled at Sri Ramakrishna Engineering College in Coimbatore, India having graduated from Jaycee Higher Secondary School. He made his debut in the 2009 film, Kulir 100° opposite Riya Bamniyal, though the film became a commercial and critical failure. Sanjeev portrayed Surya, the son of a rowdy sent to a private boarding school. He since appeared in a string of low-budget films including Neeyum Naanum (2010) and Sagakkal (2011).

In his latest release, Nanbargal Kavanathirku, produced by Green Channel Entertainment, he played the lead role opposite Manisha Jith, who had previously played Sarath Kumar's daughter in Gambeeram. After being unable to garner success as a lead actor in films, he gained fame as television actor in his debut TV series Raja Rani which aired on Vijay TV.

Personal life
Sanjeev married his co-star in series Raja Rani, who is Alya Manasa, in 2019 and have a daughter Aila Syed born on 20 March 2020 and a son Arsh Syed born on 27 March 2022.

Filmography

Films

Television

References

Indian male film actors
Tamil male actors
Living people
Male actors in Tamil cinema
1988 births
Islam in Tamil Nadu
Islam in India